Joshua Pynadath (born February 20, 2002) is an American professional soccer player who plays as a forward for Eerste Divisie team Jong AZ.

Club career

Ajax
Pynadath, whose family is Indian-American, started playing soccer at Red Star Soccer Academy in his youth. In 2013, he made headlines when Spanish giants Barcelona and Real Madrid showed interest in signing him into their youth systems. Pynadath ended up signing with Real Madrid, becoming the first American—and the first player of Indian descent—ever to join the club's youth program.

In 2015, Pynadath moved to the Netherlands and joined the Ajax youth system. On September 16, 2019, he made his professional debut when he came on as a substitute for Jong Ajax in an Eerste Divisie match against Jong PSV.

On April 9, 2020 it was announced that Pynadath had decided to leave the Ajax Youth Academy at the age of 18, seeking to play in a higher competition.

After seemingly going missing for over a year, it was reported that Pynadath was trialing with Chelsea.

AZ
On June 30, 2022 Pynadath signed a two year contract at AZ Alkmaar, joining its second team. He made his Eerste Divisie debut for Jong AZ on 16 August, 2022 in a 2-0 victory against NAC Breda.

International career
Pynadath has been capped by the United States at the U15, U17, and U18 levels.

References

External links
 
 Pynadath's Profile at Real Madrid

2002 births
Living people
People from Mountain View, California
Soccer players from California
Sportspeople from Santa Clara County, California
American sportspeople of Indian descent
Association football forwards
American soccer players
United States men's youth international soccer players
Eerste Divisie players
Jong Ajax players
Jong AZ players
American expatriate soccer players
American expatriate sportspeople in the Netherlands
Expatriate footballers in the Netherlands
De Anza Force players